Eduard Frederich, born at Hanover in 1813, attended the Academy at Düsseldorf from 1836 to 1843, and studied in particular landscape and genre painting, which he, however, changed afterwards for scenes of encampments and manoeuvres. He was court painter, and died at Hanover in 1864.

See also
 List of German painters

References
 

1813 births
1864 deaths
19th-century German painters
German male painters
Court painters
Artists from Hanover
Kunstakademie Düsseldorf alumni
19th-century German male artists